The 2014 OEC Kaohsiung was a professional tennis tournament played on hard courts. It was the third edition of the tournament which was part of the 2014 ATP Challenger Tour. It took place in Kaohsiung, Taiwan between 14 and 20 July 2014.

Singles main-draw entrants

Seeds

 1 Rankings are as of 7 July 2014.

Other entrants
The following players received wildcards into the singles main draw:
  Ho Chih-Jen
  Hung Jui-chen
  Lu Yen-hsun
  Wang Chieh-fu

The following players received entry from the qualifying draw:
  Nam Ji-sung
  Jaime Pulgar-Garcia
  Shuichi Sekiguchi
  Kento Takeuchi

Doubles main-draw entrants

Seeds

1 Rankings as of 7 July 2014.

Other entrants
The following pairs received wildcards into the doubles main draw:
  Wu Tung-lin /  Yi Chu-huan
  Chen I-Ta /  Ho Chih-Jen
  Hsieh Cheng-peng /  Yang Shao-Chi

Champions

Singles

 Lu Yen-hsun def.  Luca Vanni 6–7(7–9), 6–4, 6–4

Doubles

 Gong Maoxin /  Peng Hsien-yin def.  Chen Ti /  Huang Liang-chi 6–3, 6–2

References

External links
Official Website

OEC Kaohsiung
OEC Kaohsiung
OEC Kaohsiung
OEC Kaohsiung